

National teams

Senior team 
This section covers Uruguay's senior team matches from the end of the 2014 FIFA World Cup to the end of the 2015 Copa América.

Friendly matches

2015 Copa América

 
Seasons in Uruguayan football